Spiral is a 2019 Canadian horror thriller film, directed by Kurtis David Harder. It stars Jeffrey Bowyer-Chapman and Ari Cohen as Malik and Aaron, respectively, a same-sex couple who move to a small town with their daughter Kayla (Jennifer Laporte), only to suspect that their initial welcome from their neighbors Marshall (Lochlyn Munro) and Tiffany (Chandra West) may conceal something sinister.

It premiered August 25, 2019 at Arrow Video Frightfest and was screened at other horror and LGBTQ film festivals through late 2019 and early 2020. It premiered on Shudder in September 2020.

Production
Spiral was filmed during a 21-day period in 2018, in one of Alberta's small towns (Irricana), on a relatively low budget.

Critical reception
The movie received generally positive reviews. The website's critical consensus reads: "Spiral explores the tension between otherness and conformity with a well-acted horror story that chills even if it doesn't outright terrify." Phil Wheat of Nerdly called it "an interesting look into the pressure of being minority" and believed that Bowyer-Chapman's performance was "the very epitome of tour-de-force." His Name is Death editor Albert Nowicki praised the movie for its undertones and subtextual plot and applauded Harder for "finally giving gay characters the right to speak and tell their stories." He also stated the movie is "brave" and has "a lot of empathy."

Awards and nominations

Notes

References

External links
 
 
 Spiral at Library and Archives Canada

2019 films
2019 LGBT-related films
2019 horror thriller films
Canadian horror thriller films
Canadian LGBT-related films
English-language Canadian films
LGBT-related horror thriller films
Gay-related films
2010s English-language films
2010s Canadian films
Films shot in Alberta